QB1 may refer to:

Astronomy 
, the first trans-Neptunian object to be discovered after Pluto and Charon
Cubewano, a class of trans-Neptunian objects also known as classical Kuiper Belt objects

Other uses 
QB1 (game), a NTN Buzztime interactive American football game of predicting what play the quarterback will make

Qb1 may refer to:
Algebraic chess notation for a Queen moving to b1 in English